This page gathers the results of provincial elections in Lombardy since 2004. Elections were suspended in 2012.

Results by year

2004 provincial elections

|- 
!align=left rowspan=2 valign=center bgcolor="#E9E9E9"|
!colspan="3" align="center" valign=top bgcolor="lightblue"|House of Freedoms
!colspan="3" align="center" valign=top bgcolor="pink"|The Olive Tree
!colspan="3" align="center" valign=top bgcolor="lightgreen"|Lega Nord
!colspan="1" align="center" valign=top bgcolor="#E9E9E9"|Others
|-
|align="left" bgcolor="lightblue"|candidate
|align="center" bgcolor="lightblue"|1st round
|align="center" bgcolor="lightblue"|2nd round
|align="left" bgcolor="pink"|candidate
|align="center" bgcolor="pink"|1st round
|align="center" bgcolor="pink"|2nd round
|align="left" bgcolor="lightgreen"|candidate
|align="center" bgcolor="lightgreen"|1st round
|align="center" bgcolor="lightgreen"|2nd round
|align="center" bgcolor="#E9E9E9"|1st round
|-
|align="left" valign=top bgcolor="#E9E9E9" |Bergamo
|align="left" valign=top bgcolor="lightblue" |Valerio Bettoni(Forza Italia)
|align="center" valign=top bgcolor="lightblue" |35.2%
|align="center" valign=top bgcolor="lightblue"|52.8%
|align="left" valign=top bgcolor="pink"|Giuseppe Facchetti(Democracy is Freedom)
|align="center" valign=top bgcolor="pink"|30.3%
|align="center" valign=top bgcolor="pink"|35.2%
|align="left" bgcolor="lightgreen"|Giacomo Stucchi(Lega Lombarda–Lega Nord)
|align="center" valign=top bgcolor="lightgreen"|21.9%
|align="center" valign=top bgcolor="lightgreen"|-
|align="center" valign=top bgcolor="#E9E9E9"|11.0%
|-
|align="left" valign=top bgcolor="#E9E9E9" |Brescia
|align="left" valign=top bgcolor="lightblue" |Alberto Cavalli(Forza Italia)
|align="center" valign=top bgcolor="lightblue" |38.6%
|align="center" valign=top bgcolor="lightblue"|54.0%
|align="left" valign=top bgcolor="pink"|Ernesto Bino(Democrats of the Left)
|align="center" valign=top bgcolor="pink"|36.2%
|align="center" valign=top bgcolor="pink"|46.0%
|align="left" bgcolor="lightgreen"|Alessandro Cè(Lega Lombarda–Lega Nord)
|align="center" valign=top bgcolor="lightgreen"|13.1%
|align="center" valign=top bgcolor="lightgreen"|with CdL
|align="center" valign=top bgcolor="#E9E9E9"|12.1%
|-
|align="left" valign=top bgcolor="#E9E9E9" |Cremona
|align="left" valign=top bgcolor="lightblue" |Giovanni Rossoni(Forza Italia)
|align="center" valign=top bgcolor="lightblue" |35.6%
|align="center" valign=top bgcolor="lightblue"|44.0%
|align="left" valign=top bgcolor="pink"|Giuseppe Torchio(Democracy is Freedom)
|align="center" valign=top bgcolor="pink"|46.2%
|align="center" valign=top bgcolor="pink"|56.0%
|align="left" bgcolor="lightgreen"|Cesare Giovinetti(Lega Lombarda–Lega Nord)
|align="center" valign=top bgcolor="lightgreen"|12.4%
|align="center" valign=top bgcolor="lightgreen"|with CdL
|align="center" valign=top bgcolor="#E9E9E9"|5.8%
|-
|align="left" valign=top bgcolor="#E9E9E9" |Lecco
|align="left" valign=top bgcolor="lightblue" |Dario Luigi Perego(Forza Italia)
|align="center" valign=top bgcolor="lightblue" |31.5%
|align="center" valign=top bgcolor="lightblue"|43.5%
|align="left" valign=top bgcolor="pink"|Virginio Brivio(Democracy is Freedom)
|align="center" valign=top bgcolor="pink"|47.3%
|align="center" valign=top bgcolor="pink"|56.5%
|align="left" bgcolor="lightgreen"|Ugo Parolo(Lega Lombarda–Lega Nord)
|align="center" valign=top bgcolor="lightgreen"|20.7%
|align="center" valign=top bgcolor="lightgreen"|with CdL
|align="center" valign=top bgcolor="#E9E9E9"|0.5%
|-
|align="left" valign=top bgcolor="#E9E9E9" |Lodi
|align="left" valign=top bgcolor="lightblue" |Angelo Mazzola(Forza Italia)
|align="center" valign=top bgcolor="lightblue" |35.7%
|align="center" valign=top bgcolor="lightblue"|45.1%
|align="left" valign=top bgcolor="pink"|Lino Felissari(Democrats of the Left)
|align="center" valign=top bgcolor="pink"|44.8%
|align="center" valign=top bgcolor="pink"|54.9%
|align="left" bgcolor="lightgreen"|Mauro Rossi(Lega Lombarda–Lega Nord)
|align="center" valign=top bgcolor="lightgreen"|13.4%
|align="center" valign=top bgcolor="lightgreen"|with CdL
|align="center" valign=top bgcolor="#E9E9E9"|6.1%
|-
|align="left" valign=top bgcolor="#E9E9E9" |Milan
|align="left" valign=top bgcolor="lightblue" |Ombretta Colli(Forza Italia)
|align="center" valign=top bgcolor="lightblue"|38.3%
|align="center" valign=top bgcolor="lightblue"|46.0%
|align="left" valign=top bgcolor="pink"|Filippo Penati(Democrats of the Left)
|align="center" valign=top bgcolor="pink"|43.2%
|align="center" valign=top bgcolor="pink"|54.0%
|align="left" bgcolor="lightgreen"|Massimo Zanello(Lega Lombarda–Lega Nord)
|align="center" valign=top bgcolor="lightgreen"|8.6%
|align="center" valign=top bgcolor="lightgreen"|with CdL
|align="center" valign=top bgcolor="#E9E9E9"|9.9%
|-
|align="left" valign=top bgcolor="#E9E9E9" |Sondrio
|align="left" valign=top bgcolor="lightblue" |Eugenio Tarabini(Forza Italia)
|align="center" valign=top bgcolor="lightblue" |32.2%
|align="center" valign=top bgcolor="lightblue"|29.9%
|align="left" valign=top bgcolor="pink"|Giacomo Tognini(Democracy is Freedom)
|align="center" valign=top bgcolor="pink"|26.8%
|align="center" valign=top bgcolor="pink"|-
|align="left" bgcolor="lightgreen"|Fiorello Provera(Lega Lombarda–Lega Nord)
|align="center" valign=top bgcolor="lightgreen"|28.3%
|align="center" valign=top bgcolor="lightgreen"|70.1%
|align="center" valign=top bgcolor="#E9E9E9"|12.7%
|}
Source: La Repubblica

2006 provincial elections

|- 
!align=left rowspan=2 valign=center bgcolor="#E9E9E9"|
!colspan="3" align="center" valign=top bgcolor="lightblue"|House of Freedoms (incl. Lega Nord)
!colspan="3" align="center" valign=top bgcolor="pink"|The Union
!colspan="1" align="center" valign=top bgcolor="#E9E9E9"|Others
|-
|align="left" bgcolor="lightblue"|candidate
|align="center" bgcolor="lightblue"|1st round
|align="center" bgcolor="lightblue"|2nd round
|align="left" bgcolor="pink"|candidate
|align="center" bgcolor="pink"|1st round
|align="center" bgcolor="pink"|2nd round
|align="center" bgcolor="#E9E9E9"|1st round
|-
|align="left" valign=top bgcolor="#E9E9E9"|Mantua
|align="left" valign=top bgcolor="lightblue" |Giovanni Rossi(Forza Italia)
|align="center" valign=top bgcolor="lightblue" |45.0%
|align="center" valign=top bgcolor="lightblue"|-
|align="left" valign=top bgcolor="pink"|Maurizio Fontanili(Democracy is Freedom)
|align="center" valign=top bgcolor="pink"|53.5%
|align="center" valign=top bgcolor="pink"|-
|align="center" valign=top bgcolor="#E9E9E9"|1.5%
|-
|align="left" valign=top bgcolor="#E9E9E9"|Pavia
|align="left" valign=top bgcolor="lightblue" |Vittorio Poma(Forza Italia)
|align="center" valign=top bgcolor="lightblue" |50.3%
|align="center" valign=top bgcolor="lightblue"|-
|align="left" valign=top bgcolor="pink"|Andrea Albergati(Democracy is Freedom)
|align="center" valign=top bgcolor="pink"|46.4%
|align="center" valign=top bgcolor="pink"|-
|align="center" valign=top bgcolor="#E9E9E9"|3.2%
|}
Source: La Repubblica

2007 provincial elections

|- 
!align=left rowspan=2 valign=center bgcolor="#E9E9E9"|
!colspan="3" align="center" valign=top bgcolor="lightblue"|House of Freedoms (incl. Lega Nord)
!colspan="3" align="center" valign=top bgcolor="pink"|The Union
!colspan="1" align="center" valign=top bgcolor="#E9E9E9"|Others
|-
|align="left" bgcolor="lightblue"|candidate
|align="center" bgcolor="lightblue"|1st round
|align="center" bgcolor="lightblue"|2nd round
|align="left" bgcolor="pink"|candidate
|align="center" bgcolor="pink"|1st round
|align="center" bgcolor="pink"|2nd round
|align="center" bgcolor="#E9E9E9"|1st round
|-
|align="left" valign=top bgcolor="#E9E9E9"|Como
|align="left" valign=top bgcolor="lightblue" |Leonardo Carioni(Lega Lombarda–Lega Nord)
|align="center" valign=top bgcolor="lightblue" |67.8%
|align="center" valign=top bgcolor="lightblue"|-
|align="left" valign=top bgcolor="pink"|Mauro Guerra(Democrats of the Left)
|align="center" valign=top bgcolor="pink"|28.6%
|align="center" valign=top bgcolor="pink"|-
|align="center" valign=top bgcolor="#E9E9E9"|3.7%
|-
|align="left" valign=top bgcolor="#E9E9E9"|Varese
|align="left" valign=top bgcolor="lightblue" |Marco Reguzzoni(Lega Lombarda–Lega Nord)
|align="center" valign=top bgcolor="lightblue" |67.1%
|align="center" valign=top bgcolor="lightblue"|-
|align="left" valign=top bgcolor="pink"|Mario Aspesi(Democracy is Freedom)
|align="center" valign=top bgcolor="pink"|25.3%
|align="center" valign=top bgcolor="pink"|-
|align="center" valign=top bgcolor="#E9E9E9"|7.7%
|}
Source: La Repubblica

2008 provincial elections

|- 
!align=left rowspan=2 valign=center bgcolor="#E9E9E9"|
!colspan="3" align="center" valign=top bgcolor="lightblue"|The People of Freedom–Lega Nord
!colspan="3" align="center" valign=top bgcolor="pink"|Democratic Party and allies
!colspan="1" align="center" valign=top bgcolor="#E9E9E9"|Others
|-
|align="left" bgcolor="lightblue"|candidate
|align="center" bgcolor="lightblue"|1st round
|align="center" bgcolor="lightblue"|2nd round
|align="left" bgcolor="pink"|candidate
|align="center" bgcolor="pink"|1st round
|align="center" bgcolor="pink"|2nd round
|align="center" bgcolor="#E9E9E9"|1st round
|-
|align="left" valign=top bgcolor="#E9E9E9"|Varese
|align="left" valign=top bgcolor="lightblue" |Dario Galli(Lega Lombarda–Lega Nord)
|align="center" valign=top bgcolor="lightblue" |64.1%
|align="center" valign=top bgcolor="lightblue"|-
|align="left" valign=top bgcolor="pink"|Mario Aspesi(Democratic Party)
|align="center" valign=top bgcolor="pink"|26.1%
|align="center" valign=top bgcolor="pink"|-
|align="center" valign=top bgcolor="#E9E9E9"|13.0%
|}
Source: La Repubblica

2009 provincial elections

|- 
!align=left rowspan=2 valign=center bgcolor="#E9E9E9"|
!colspan="3" align="center" valign=top bgcolor="lightblue"|The People of Freedom–Lega Nord
!colspan="3" align="center" valign=top bgcolor="pink"|Democratic Party and allies
!colspan="3" align="center" valign=top bgcolor="#CCCCFF"|Union of the Centre
!colspan="1" align="center" valign=top bgcolor="#E9E9E9"|Others
|-
|align="left" bgcolor="lightblue"|candidate
|align="center" bgcolor="lightblue"|1st round
|align="center" bgcolor="lightblue"|2nd round
|align="left" bgcolor="pink"|candidate
|align="center" bgcolor="pink"|1st round
|align="center" bgcolor="pink"|2nd round
|align="left" bgcolor="#CCCCFF"|candidate
|align="center" bgcolor="#CCCCFF"|1st round
|align="center" bgcolor="#CCCCFF"|2nd round
|align="center" bgcolor="#E9E9E9"|1st round
|-
|align="left" valign=top bgcolor="#E9E9E9" |Bergamo
|align="left" valign=top bgcolor="lightblue"|Ettore Pirovano(Lega Lombarda–Lega Nord)
|align="center" valign=top bgcolor="lightblue"|59.0%
|align="center" valign=top bgcolor="lightblue"|-
|align="left" valign=top bgcolor="pink"|Francesco Cornolti(Democratic Party)
|align="center" valign=top bgcolor="pink"|20.3%
|align="center" valign=top bgcolor="pink"|-
|align="left" bgcolor="#CCCCFF"|Luigi Pisoni(Union of the Centre)
|align="center" valign=top bgcolor="#CCCCFF"|13.6%
|align="center" valign=top bgcolor="#CCCCFF"|-
|align="center" valign=top bgcolor="#E9E9E9"|7.1%
|-
|align="left" valign=top bgcolor="#E9E9E9"|Brescia
|align="left" valign=top bgcolor="lightblue"|Daniele Molgora(Lega Lombarda–Lega Nord)
|align="center" valign=top bgcolor="lightblue"|55.5%
|align="center" valign=top bgcolor="lightblue"|-
|align="left" valign=top bgcolor="pink"|Diego Peli(Democratic Party)
|align="center" valign=top bgcolor="pink"|22.5%
|align="center" valign=top bgcolor="pink"|-
|align="left" bgcolor="#CCCCFF"|Gianmarco Quadrini(Union of the Centre)
|align="center" valign=top bgcolor="#CCCCFF"|7.6%
|align="center" valign=top bgcolor="#CCCCFF"|-
|align="center" valign=top bgcolor="#E9E9E9"|14.4%
|-
|align="left" valign=top bgcolor="#E9E9E9"|Cremona
|align="left" valign=top bgcolor="lightblue"|Massimiliano Salini(The People of Freedom)
|align="center" valign=top bgcolor="lightblue"|51.1%
|align="center" valign=top bgcolor="lightblue"|-
|align="left" valign=top bgcolor="pink"|Giuseppe Torchio(Democratic Party)
|align="center" valign=top bgcolor="pink"|35.9%
|align="center" valign=top bgcolor="pink"|-
|align="left" bgcolor="#CCCCFF"|Giuseppe Trespidi(Union of the Centre)
|align="center" valign=top bgcolor="#CCCCFF"|4.1%
|align="center" valign=top bgcolor="#CCCCFF"|-
|align="center" valign=top bgcolor="#E9E9E9"|9.0%
|-
|align="left" valign=top bgcolor="#E9E9E9"|Lecco
|align="left" valign=top bgcolor="lightblue"|Daniele Nava(The People of Freedom)
|align="center" valign=top bgcolor="lightblue"|54.3%
|align="center" valign=top bgcolor="lightblue"|-
|align="left" valign=top bgcolor="pink"|Virginio Brivio(Democratic Party)
|align="center" valign=top bgcolor="pink"|38.0%
|align="center" valign=top bgcolor="pink"|-
|align="left" bgcolor="#CCCCFF"|Marco Carboni(Union of the Centre)
|align="center" valign=top bgcolor="#CCCCFF"|3.4%
|align="center" valign=top bgcolor="#CCCCFF"|-
|align="center" valign=top bgcolor="#E9E9E9"|4.2%
|-
|align="left" valign=top bgcolor="#E9E9E9"|Lodi
|align="left" valign=top bgcolor="lightblue"|Pietro Foroni(Lega Lombarda–Lega Nord)
|align="center" valign=top bgcolor="lightblue"|54.2%
|align="center" valign=top bgcolor="lightblue"|-
|align="left" valign=top bgcolor="pink"|Lino Felissari(Democratic Party)
|align="center" valign=top bgcolor="pink"|38.2%
|align="center" valign=top bgcolor="pink"|-
|align="left" bgcolor="#CCCCFF"|Giacomo Arcaini(Union of the Centre)
|align="center" valign=top bgcolor="#CCCCFF"|4.0%
|align="center" valign=top bgcolor="#CCCCFF"|-
|align="center" valign=top bgcolor="#E9E9E9"|3.6%
|-
|align="left" valign=top bgcolor="#E9E9E9" |Milan
|align="left" valign=top bgcolor="lightblue"|Guido Podestà(The People of Freedom)
|align="center" valign=top bgcolor="lightblue"|48.8%
|align="center" valign=top bgcolor="lightblue"|50.2%
|align="left" valign=top bgcolor="pink"|Filippo Penati(Democratic Party)
|align="center" valign=top bgcolor="pink"|38.8%
|align="center" valign=top bgcolor="pink"|49.8%
|align="left" bgcolor="#CCCCFF"|Enrico Marcora(Union of the Centre)
|align="center" valign=top bgcolor="#CCCCFF"|3.7%
|align="center" valign=top bgcolor="#CCCCFF"|-
|align="center" valign=top bgcolor="#E9E9E9"|8.6%
|-
|align="left" valign=top bgcolor="#E9E9E9"|Monza
|align="left" valign=top bgcolor="lightblue"|Dario Allevi(The People of Freedom)
|align="center" valign=top bgcolor="lightblue"|54.1%
|align="center" valign=top bgcolor="lightblue"|-
|align="left" valign=top bgcolor="pink"|Pietro Luigi Ponti(Democratic Party)
|align="center" valign=top bgcolor="pink"|33.5%
|align="center" valign=top bgcolor="pink"|-
|align="left" bgcolor="#CCCCFF"|Domenico Pisani(Union of the Centre)
|align="center" valign=top bgcolor="#CCCCFF"|4.5%
|align="center" valign=top bgcolor="#CCCCFF"|-
|align="center" valign=top bgcolor="#E9E9E9"|7.9%
|-
|align="left" valign=top bgcolor="#E9E9E9"|Sondrio
|align="left" valign=top bgcolor="lightblue"|Massimo Sertori(Lega Lombarda–Lega Nord)
|align="center" valign=top bgcolor="lightblue"|61.1%
|align="center" valign=top bgcolor="lightblue"|-
|align="left" valign=top bgcolor="pink"|Giacomo Ciapponi(Democratic Party)
|align="center" valign=top bgcolor="pink"|31.8%
|align="center" valign=top bgcolor="pink"|-
|align="left" bgcolor="#CCCCFF"|Michele Aili(Union of the Centre)
|align="center" valign=top bgcolor="#CCCCFF"|4.9%
|align="center" valign=top bgcolor="#CCCCFF"|-
|align="center" valign=top bgcolor="#E9E9E9"|2.2%
|}
Source: La Repubblica

2011 provincial elections

|- 
!align=left rowspan=2 valign=center bgcolor="#E9E9E9"|
!colspan="3" align="center" valign=top bgcolor="lightblue"|The People of Freedom–Lega Nord
!colspan="3" align="center" valign=top bgcolor="pink"|Democratic Party and allies
!colspan="3" align="center" valign=top bgcolor="#CCCCFF"|Union of the Centre
!colspan="1" align="center" valign=top bgcolor="#E9E9E9"|Others
|-
|align="left" bgcolor="lightblue"|candidate
|align="center" bgcolor="lightblue"|1st round
|align="center" bgcolor="lightblue"|2nd round
|align="left" bgcolor="pink"|candidate
|align="center" bgcolor="pink"|1st round
|align="center" bgcolor="pink"|2nd round
|align="left" bgcolor="#CCCCFF"|candidate
|align="center" bgcolor="#CCCCFF"|1st round
|align="center" bgcolor="#CCCCFF"|2nd round
|align="center" bgcolor="#E9E9E9"|1st round
|-
|align="left" valign=top bgcolor="#E9E9E9" |Mantua
|align="left" valign=top bgcolor="lightblue"|Giovanni Fava(Lega Lombarda–Lega Nord)
|align="center" valign=top bgcolor="lightblue"|41.1%
|align="center" valign=top bgcolor="lightblue"|42.7%
|align="left" valign=top bgcolor="pink"|Alessandro Pastacci(Democratic Party)
|align="center" valign=top bgcolor="pink"|41.8%
|align="center" valign=top bgcolor="pink"|57.3%
|align="left" bgcolor="#CCCCFF"|Pietro Marcazzan(Union of the Centre)
|align="center" valign=top bgcolor="#CCCCFF"|5.1%
|align="center" valign=top bgcolor="#CCCCFF"|-
|align="center" valign=top bgcolor="#E9E9E9"|12.0%
|-
|align="left" valign=top bgcolor="#E9E9E9"|Pavia
|align="left" valign=top bgcolor="lightblue"|Ruggero Invernizzi(The People of Freedom)
|align="center" valign=top bgcolor="lightblue"|44.1%
|align="center" valign=top bgcolor="lightblue"|48.8%
|align="left" valign=top bgcolor="pink"|Daniele Bosone(Democratic Party)
|align="center" valign=top bgcolor="pink"|33.8%
|align="center" valign=top bgcolor="pink"|51.2%
|align="left" bgcolor="#CCCCFF"|Vittorio Poma(Union of the Centre)
|align="center" valign=top bgcolor="#CCCCFF"|9.6%
|align="center" valign=top bgcolor="#CCCCFF"|-
|align="center" valign=top bgcolor="#E9E9E9"|12.5%
|}
Source: Ministry of the Interior

Elections in Lombardy